Modrava is a municipality and village in Klatovy District in the Plzeň Region of the Czech Republic. It has about 100 inhabitants.

Administrative parts
The village of Filipova Huť is an administrative part of Modrava.

References

Villages in Klatovy District
Bohemian Forest